Southwestern Community College (SWCC) is an American public community college with its main campus in Creston, Iowa. It also has centers in Red Oak, Iowa, and Osceola, Iowa.  In addition to an arts and sciences program, SWCC offers career and technical education (CTE) degrees and certificates.

History
Southwestern Community College (SWCC) began operation as part of the Iowa community college system in 1966, on a  campus in northwest Creston, Iowa. SWCC is a two-year public institution offering programs for transfer to four-year colleges and universities; career and technical education programs to train students for the workforce; continuing education courses and programs; and industrial training classes. Southwestern inherited the facilities and instructional programs of Creston Community College, which had been operated by the Creston Community School district since 1926.

In 1970, the campus was expanded with construction of a technical center, administrative offices, and a student center.  

In 1995 a Wellness Center was built; it included an Olympic sized pool, gymnasium, and performing arts auditorium. The Wellness Center also hosts the Southern Prairie Family Fitness Center and adult and continuing education department. In 2000 another addition to the campus was made, which added an allied health and science center, a second technical center, and the Spartan Suites apartment-style dormitories.

On April 14, 2012, during the tornado outbreak of April 13–16, 2012, an EF2 tornado struck Creston, resulting in considerable damage to the campus.

Each semester, SWCC has an enrollment of approximately 1,500 students.

SWCC won the 2017 NJCAA Men's Division II Basketball Championship, the first national title in Spartan history.

Board of Trustees
SWCC is governed by an eight-member board of trustees. They represent eight districts. The board includes Jane Ernst of Greenfield (District 1), Fred Shearer of Corning (District 2), Jerry Smith of Osceola (District 3), Carol Saxton of Leon (District 4), Kevin Britten of Red Oak (District 5), Zach Gunsolley of Diagonal (District 6), TBA (District 7), and Tony Cass of Creston (District 8).

Notable alumni
 Lee Nailon, NBA basketball player and 2007 Israeli Basketball Premier League MVP

References

External links

Community colleges in Iowa
Educational institutions established in 1966
Education in Union County, Iowa
Education in Montgomery County, Iowa
Education in Clarke County, Iowa
1966 establishments in Iowa
NJCAA athletics
Creston, Iowa